"Mean Girl" is a single released by the British rock band Status Quo in 1973. It was taken from their November 1971 album Dog of Two Head.

Pye Records released the song more than a year after the album, following the success of the single "Paper Plane", released in November 1972 on the Vertigo label. It became a UK Top 20 hit – previously only three of the ten Pye singles had made the Top 20. They tried this again with the single "Gerdundula", another track from the same album, but it failed to chart.

The band included the song in the set for their 2009 Glastonbury Festival debut.

Singles
 1973: "Mean Girl"  (Rossi/Young) (3.53) / "Everything" (Rossi/Parfitt) (2.35) Vinyl 7", Pye: 7N 45229, United Kingdom
 1973: "Mean Girl" / "Tune to the Music", Vinyl 7", Pye: 12 661 AT, Germany 
 1978: "Mean Girl" / "In My Chair", Vinyl 7", Pye: 7N 46095, United Kingdom  
 1986: "Mean Girl" / "Technicolour Dreams", Vinyl 7", BR / 45096, Netherlands

Personnel
 Francis Rossi - lead guitar, acoustic guitar, lead vocals
 Rick Parfitt - rhythm guitar, acoustic guitar, piano, backing vocals
 Alan Lancaster - bass, guitar
 John Coghlan - drums, percussion
 Bruce Foster - piano

Charts

References

Status Quo (band) songs
1973 singles
Songs written by Francis Rossi
Songs written by Bob Young (musician)
1971 songs
Pye Records singles
Song recordings produced by John Schroeder (musician)
British hard rock songs